Shand Kydd is an English surname.  It may refer to:

Frances Shand Kydd (1936–2004), the mother of Diana, Princess of Wales
John Shand Kydd (b. 1959), British photographer
Peter Shand Kydd (1925–2006),  onetime stepfather of Diana, Princess of Wales

See also
Shand
Kydd (surname)